YouTube is a global online video sharing and social media platform headquartered in San Bruno, California. It was launched on February 14, 2005, by Steve Chen, Chad Hurley, and Jawed Karim. It is owned by Google and is the second most visited website, after Google Search. YouTube has more than 2.5 billion monthly users, who collectively watch more than one billion hours of videos each day. , videos were being uploaded at a rate of more than 500 hours of content per minute.

In October 2006, YouTube was bought by Google for $1.65 billion. Google's ownership of YouTube expanded the site's business model, expanding from generating revenue from advertisements alone to offering paid content such as movies and exclusive content produced by YouTube. It also offers YouTube Premium, a paid subscription option for watching content without ads. YouTube also approved creators to participate in Google's AdSense program, which seeks to generate more revenue for both parties. YouTube reported revenue of $29.2 billion in 2022. In 2021, YouTube's annual advertising revenue increased to $28.8 billion, an increase in revenue of 9 billion from the previous year.

Since its purchase by Google, YouTube has expanded beyond the core website into mobile apps, network television, and the ability to link with other platforms. Video categories on YouTube include music videos, video clips, news, short films, feature films, songs, documentaries, movie trailers, teasers, live streams, vlogs, and more. Most content is generated by individuals, including collaborations between YouTubers and corporate sponsors. Established media corporations such as Disney, Paramount, NBCUniversal, and Warner Bros. Discovery have also created and expanded their corporate YouTube channels to advertise to a larger audience.

YouTube has had unprecedented social impact, influencing popular culture, internet trends, and creating multimillionaire celebrities. Despite all its growth and success, YouTube has been widely criticized. Criticism of YouTube includes the website being used to facilitate the spread of misinformation, copyright issues, routine violations of its users' privacy, enabling censorship, their guidelines and how they are implemented, and endangering child safety and wellbeing.

History

Founding and initial growth (2005–2006)

YouTube was founded by Steve Chen, Chad Hurley, and Jawed Karim. The trio were early employees of PayPal, which left them enriched after the company was bought by eBay. Hurley had studied design at the Indiana University of Pennsylvania, and Chen and Karim studied computer science together at the University of Illinois Urbana-Champaign.

According to a story that has often been repeated in the media, Hurley and Chen developed the idea for YouTube during the early months of 2005, after they had experienced difficulty sharing videos that had been shot at a dinner party at Chen's apartment in San Francisco. Karim did not attend the party and denied that it had occurred, but Chen remarked that the idea that YouTube was founded after a dinner party "was probably very strengthened by marketing ideas around creating a story that was very digestible".

Karim said the inspiration for YouTube first came from the Super Bowl XXXVIII halftime show controversy, when Janet Jackson's breast was briefly exposed by Justin Timberlake during the halftime show. Karim could not easily find video clips of the incident and the 2004 Indian Ocean Tsunami online, which led to the idea of a video-sharing site. Hurley and Chen said that the original idea for YouTube was a video version of an online dating service and had been influenced by the website Hot or Not. They created posts on Craigslist asking attractive women to upload videos of themselves to YouTube in exchange for a $100 reward. Difficulty in finding enough dating videos led to a change of plans, with the site's founders deciding to accept uploads of any video.

YouTube began as a venture capital–funded technology startup. Between November 2005 and April 2006, the company raised money from various investors, with Sequoia Capital, $11.5 million, and Artis Capital Management, $8 million, being the largest two. YouTube's early headquarters were situated above a pizzeria and a Japanese restaurant in San Mateo, California. In February 2005, the company activated www.youtube.com. The first video was uploaded April 23, 2005. Titled Me at the zoo, it shows co-founder Jawed Karim at the San Diego Zoo and can still be viewed on the site. In May, the company launched a public beta and by November, a Nike ad featuring Ronaldinho became the first video to reach one million total views. The site launched officially on December 15, 2005, by which time the site was receiving 8 million views a day. Clips at the time were limited to 100 megabytes, as little as 30 seconds of footage.

YouTube was not the first video-sharing site on the Internet; Vimeo was launched in November 2004, though that site remained a side project of its developers from CollegeHumor at the time and did not grow much, either. The week of YouTube's launch, NBC-Universal's Saturday Night Live ran a skit "Lazy Sunday" by The Lonely Island. Besides helping to bolster ratings and long-term viewership for Saturday Night Live, "Lazy Sunday"'s status as an early viral video helped establish YouTube as an important website. Unofficial uploads of the skit to YouTube drew in more than five million collective views by February 2006 before they were removed when NBCUniversal requested it two months later based on copyright concerns. Despite eventually being taken down, these duplicate uploads of the skit helped popularize YouTube's reach and led to the upload of more third-party content. The site grew rapidly; in July 2006, the company announced that more than 65,000 new videos were being uploaded every day and that the site was receiving 100 million video views per day.

The choice of the name www.youtube.com led to problems for a similarly named website, www.utube.com. That site's owner, Universal Tube & Rollform Equipment, filed a lawsuit against YouTube in November 2006 after being regularly overloaded by people looking for YouTube. Universal Tube subsequently changed its website to www.utubeonline.com.

Broadcast Yourself era (2006–2013)

On October 9, 2006, Google announced that it had acquired YouTube for $1.65 billion in Google stock. The deal was finalized on November 13, 2006. Google's acquisition launched new newfound interest in video-sharing sites; IAC, which now owned Vimeo, focused on supporting the content creators to distinguish itself from YouTube. It is at this time YouTube issued the slogan "Broadcast Yourself". 
The company experienced rapid growth. The Daily Telegraph wrote that in 2007, YouTube consumed as much bandwidth as the entire Internet in 2000. By 2010, the company had reached a market share of around 43% and more than 14 billion views of videos, according to comScore. That year, the company simplified its interface to increase the time users would spend on the site. In 2011, more than three billion videos were being watched each day with 48 hours of new videos uploaded every minute. However, most of these views came from a relatively small number of videos; according to a software engineer at that time, 30% of videos accounted for 99% of views on the site. That year, the company again changed its interface and at the same time, introduced a new logo with a darker shade of red. A subsequent interface change, designed to unify the experience across desktop, TV, and mobile, was rolled out in 2013. By that point, more than 100 hours were being uploaded every minute, increasing to 300 hours by November 2014.

During this time, the company also went through some organizational changes. In October 2006, YouTube moved to a new office in San Bruno, California. Hurley announced that he would be stepping down as a chief executive officer of YouTube to take an advisory role and that Salar Kamangar would take over as head of the company in October 2010.

In December 2009, YouTube partnered with Vevo. In April 2010, Lady Gaga's "Bad Romance" became the most viewed video, becoming the first video to reach 200 million views on May 9, 2010.

Susan Wojcicki and going mainstream (2014–2018)

Susan Wojcicki was appointed CEO of YouTube in February 2014. In January 2016, YouTube expanded its headquarters in San Bruno by purchasing an office park for $215 million. The complex has 51,468 square metres (554,000 square feet) of space and can house up to 2,800 employees. YouTube officially launched the "polymer" redesign of its user interfaces based on Material Design language as its default, as well a redesigned logo that is built around the service's play button emblem in August 2017.

Through this period, YouTube tried several new ways to generate revenue beyond advertisements. In 2013, YouTube launched a pilot program for content providers to offer premium, subscription-based channels. This effort was discontinued in January 2018 and relaunched in June, with US$4.99 channel subscriptions. These channel subscriptions complemented the existing Super Chat ability, launched in 2017, which allows viewers to donate between $1 and $500 to have their comment highlighted. In 2014, YouTube announced a subscription service known as "Music Key," which bundled ad-free streaming of music content on YouTube with the existing Google Play Music service. The service continued to evolve in 2015 when YouTube announced YouTube Red, a new premium service that would offer ad-free access to all content on the platform (succeeding the Music Key service released the previous year), premium original series, and films produced by YouTube personalities, as well as background playback of content on mobile devices. YouTube also released YouTube Music, a third app oriented towards streaming and discovering the music content hosted on the YouTube platform.

The company also attempted to create products appealing to specific viewers. YouTube released a mobile app known as YouTube Kids in 2015, designed to provide an experience optimized for children. It features a simplified user interface, curated selections of channels featuring age-appropriate content, and parental control features. Also in 2015, YouTube launched YouTube Gaming—a video gaming-oriented vertical and app for videos and live streaming, intended to compete with the Amazon.com-owned Twitch.

The company was attacked on April 3, 2018, when a shooting occurred at YouTube's headquarters in San Bruno, California, which wounded four and resulted in one death (the shooter).

Recent history (2019–present) 
By February 2017, one billion hours of YouTube videos were being watched every day, and 400 hours worth of videos were uploaded every minute. Two years later, the uploads had risen to more than 500 hours per minute. During the COVID-19 pandemic, when most of the world was under stay-at-home orders, usage of services like YouTube significantly increased. One data firm estimated that YouTube was accounting for 15% of all internet traffic, twice its pre-pandemic level. In response to EU officials requesting that such services reduce bandwidth as to make sure medical entities had sufficient bandwidth to share information, YouTube and Netflix stated they would reduce streaming quality for at least thirty days as to cut bandwidth use of their services by 25% to comply with the EU's request. YouTube later announced that they would continue with this move worldwide: "We continue to work closely with governments and network operators around the globe to do our part to minimize stress on the system during this unprecedented situation."

Following a 2018 complaint alleging violations of the Children's Online Privacy Protection Act (COPPA), the company was fined $170 million by the FTC for collecting personal information from minors under the age of 13. YouTube was also ordered to create systems to increase children's privacy. Following criticisms of its implementation of those systems, YouTube started treating all videos designated as "made for kids" as liable under COPPA on January 6, 2020. Joining the YouTube Kids app, the company created a supervised mode, designed more for tweens, in 2021. Additionally, to compete with TikTok, YouTube released YouTube Shorts, a short-form video platform.

During this period, YouTube entered disputes with other tech companies. For over a year, in 2018 and 2019, no YouTube app was available for Amazon Fire products. In 2020, Roku removed the YouTube TV app from its streaming store after the two companies were unable to reach an agreement.

After testing earlier in 2021, YouTube removed public display of dislike counts on videos in November 2021, claiming the reason for the removal was, based on its internal research, that users often used the dislike feature as a form of cyberbullying and brigading. While some users praised the move as a way to discourage trolls, others felt that hiding dislikes would make it harder for viewers to recognize clickbait or unhelpful videos and that other features already existed for creators to limit bullying. YouTube co-founder Jawed Karim referred to the update as "a stupid idea", and that the real reason behind the change was "not a good one, and not one that will be publicly disclosed." He felt that users' ability on a social platform to identify harmful content was essential, saying, "The process works, and there's a name for it: the wisdom of the crowds. The process breaks when the platform interferes with it. Then, the platform invariably declines." Shortly after the announcement, software developer Dmitry Selivanov created Return YouTube Dislike, an open-source, third-party browser extension for Chrome and Firefox that allows users to see a video's number of dislikes. In a letter published on January 25, 2022 by then YouTube CEO Susan Wojcicki, acknowledged that removing public dislike counts was a controversial decision, but reiterated that she stands by this decision, claiming that "it reduced dislike attacks."

In 2022, YouTube launched an experiment where the company would show users who watched longer videos on TVs a long chain of short unskippable adverts, intending to consolidate all ads into the beginning of a video. Following public outrage over the unprecedented amount of unskippable ads, YouTube "ended" the experiment on September 19 of that year. In October, YouTube announced that they would be rolling out customizable user handles (e.g. @MrBeast) in addition to channel names, which would also become channel URLs.

On February 16, 2023, Wojcicki announced that she would step down as CEO, with Neal Mohan named as her successor. Wojcicki will take on an advisory role for Google and parent company Alphabet.

Senior leadership 
YouTube has been led by a CEO since its founding in 2005, and has retained this leadership model even after its acquisition by Google. The current CEO is Neal Mohan, who was appointed on February 16, 2023.

List of CEOs 

 Chad Hurley (2005–2010)
 Salar Kamangar (2010–2014)
 Susan Wojcicki (2014–2023)
 Neal Mohan (since February 2023)

Features

Video technology

YouTube primarily uses the VP9 and H.264/MPEG-4 AVC video codecs, and the Dynamic Adaptive Streaming over HTTP protocol. MPEG-4 Part 2 streams contained within 3GP containers are also provided for low bandwidth connections. By January 2019, YouTube had begun rolling out videos in AV1 format. In 2021 it was reported that the company was considering requiring AV1 in streaming hardware in order to decrease bandwidth and increase quality. Video is usually streamed alongside the Opus and AAC audio codecs.

At launch in 2005, viewing YouTube videos on a personal computer required the Adobe Flash Player plug-in to be installed in the browser. In January 2010, YouTube launched an experimental version of the site that used the built-in multimedia capabilities of web browsers supporting the HTML5 standard. This allowed videos to be viewed without requiring Adobe Flash Player or any other plug-in to be installed. On January 27, 2015, YouTube announced that HTML5 would be the default playback method on supported browsers. HTML5 video streams use Dynamic Adaptive Streaming over HTTP (MPEG-DASH), an HTTP-based adaptive bit-rate streaming solution optimizes the bitrate and quality for the available network.

The platform can serve videos at optionally lower resolution levels starting at 144p for smoothening playback in areas and countries with limited Internet speeds, improving compatibility, as well as for the preservation of limited cellular data plans. The resolution can be adjusted automatically based on detected connection speed or set manually.

From 2008 to 2017, users could add "annotations" to their videos—such as pop-up text messages and hyperlinks, which allowed for interactive videos. By 2019 all annotations had been removed from videos, breaking some videos which depended on the feature. YouTube introduced standardized widgets intended to replace annotations in a cross-platform manner, including "end screens" (a customizable array of thumbnails for specified videos displayed near the end of the video).

In 2018, YouTube became an ISNI registry, and announced its intention to begin creating ISNI identifiers to uniquely identify the musicians whose videos it features. Users can verify their account, normally through a mobile phone, to gain the ability to upload videos up to 12 hours in length, as well as produce live streams. When YouTube was launched in 2005, it was possible to upload longer videos, but a 10-minute limit was introduced in March 2006 after YouTube found that the majority of videos exceeding this length were unauthorized uploads of television shows and films. The 10-minute limit was increased to 15 minutes in July 2010. Videos can be at most 256 GB in size or 12 hours, whichever is less. , automatic closed captions using speech recognition technology when a video is uploaded is available in 13 languages, and can be machine-translated during playback.

YouTube also offers manual closed captioning as part of its creator studio. YouTube formerly offered a 'Community Captions' feature, where viewers could write and submit captions for public display upon approval by the video uploader, but this was deprecated in September 2020.

YouTube accepts the most common container formats, including MP4, Matroska, FLV, AVI, WebM, 3GP, MPEG-PS, and the QuickTime File Format. Some intermediate video formats (i.e., primarily used for professional video editing, not for final delivery or storage) are also accepted, such as ProRes. YouTube provides recommended encoding settings.

Each video is identified by an eleven-character case-sensitive alphanumerical Base64 string in the Uniform Resource Locator (URL) which can contain letters, digits, an underscore (_), and a dash (-).

In 2018, YouTube added a feature called Premiere which displays a notification to the user mentioning when the video will be available for the first time, like for a live stream but with a prerecorded video. When the scheduled time arrives, the video is aired as a live broadcast with a two-minute countdown. Optionally, a premiere can be initiated immediately.

Quality and formats

YouTube originally offered videos at only one quality level, displayed at a resolution of 320×240 pixels using the Sorenson Spark codec (a variant of H.263), with mono MP3 audio. In June 2007, YouTube added an option to watch videos in 3GP format on mobile phones. In March 2008, a high-quality mode was added, which increased the resolution to 480×360 pixels. In December 2008, 720p HD support was added. At the time of the 720p launch, the YouTube player was changed from a 4:3 aspect ratio to a widescreen 16:9. With this new feature, YouTube began a switchover to H.264/MPEG-4 AVC as its default video compression format. In November 2009, 1080p HD support was added. In July 2010, YouTube announced that it had launched a range of videos in 4K format, which allows a resolution of up to 4096×3072 pixels. In July 2010, support for 4K resolution was added, with the videos playing at 3840 × 2160 pixels. In June 2015, support for 8K resolution was added, with the videos playing at 7680×4320 pixels. In November 2016, support for HDR video was added which can be encoded with hybrid log–gamma (HLG) or perceptual quantizer (PQ). HDR video can be encoded with the Rec. 2020 color space.

In June 2014, YouTube began to deploy support for high frame rate videos up to 60 frames per second (as opposed to 30 before), becoming available for user uploads in October. YouTube stated that this would enhance "motion-intensive" videos, such as video game footage.

YouTube videos are available in a range of quality levels. Viewers only indirectly influence the video quality. In the mobile apps, users choose between "Auto", which adjusts resolution based on the internet connection, "High Picture Quality" which will prioritize playing high-quality video, "Data saver" which will sacrifice video quality in favor of low data usage and "Advanced" which lets the user choose a stream resolution. On desktop, users choose between "Auto" and a specific resolution. It is not possible for the viewer to directly choose a higher bitrate (quality) for any selected resolution.

Since 2009, viewers have had the ability to watch 3D videos. In 2015, YouTube began natively supporting 360-degree video. Since April 2016, it allowed live streaming 360° video, and both normal and 360° video at up to 1440p, and since November 2016 both at up to 4K (2160p) resolution. Citing the limited number of users who watched more than 90-degrees, it began supporting an alternative stereoscopic video format known as VR180 which it said was easier to produce, which allows users to watch any video using virtual reality headsets.

In response to increased viewership during the COVID-19 pandemic, YouTube temporarily downgraded the quality of its videos. YouTube developed its own chip, called Argos, to help with encoding higher resolution videos in 2021.

In certain cases, YouTube allows the uploader to upgrade the quality of videos uploaded a long time ago in poor quality. One such partnership with Universal Music Group included remasters of 1,000 music videos.

Live streaming
YouTube carried out early experiments with live streaming, including a concert by U2 in 2009, and a question-and-answer session with US President Barack Obama in February 2010. These tests had relied on technology from 3rd-party partners, but in September 2010, YouTube began testing its own live streaming infrastructure. In April 2011, YouTube announced the rollout of YouTube Live. The creation of live streams was initially limited to select partners. It was used for real-time broadcasting of events such as the 2012 Olympics in London. In October 2012, more than 8 million people watched Felix Baumgartner's jump from the edge of space as a live stream on YouTube.

In May 2013, creation of live streams was opened to verified users with at least 1,000 subscribers; in August of the same year the number was reduced to 100 subscribers, and in December the limit was removed. In February 2017, live streaming was introduced to the official YouTube mobile app. Live streaming via mobile was initially restricted to users with at least 10,000 subscribers, but as of mid-2017 it has been reduced to 100 subscribers. Live streams support HDR, can be up to 4K resolution at 60 fps, and also support 360° video.

User features

Comment system 

Most videos enable users to leave comments, and these have attracted attention for the negative aspects of both their form and content. In 2006, Time praised Web 2.0 for enabling "community and collaboration on a scale never seen before", and added that YouTube "harnesses the stupidity of crowds as well as its wisdom. Some of the comments on YouTube make you weep for the future of humanity just for the spelling alone, never mind the obscenity and the naked hatred". The Guardian in 2009 described users' comments on YouTube as:

The Daily Telegraph commented in September 2008, that YouTube was "notorious" for "some of the most confrontational and ill-formed comment exchanges on the internet", and reported on YouTube Comment Snob, "a new piece of software that blocks rude and illiterate posts". The Huffington Post noted in April 2012 that finding comments on YouTube that appear "offensive, stupid and crass" to the "vast majority" of the people is hardly difficult.

Google subsequently implemented a comment system oriented on Google+ on November 6, 2013, that required all YouTube users to use a Google+ account to comment on videos. The stated motivation for the change was giving creators more power to moderate and block comments, thereby addressing frequent criticisms of their quality and tone. The new system restored the ability to include URLs in comments, which had previously been removed due to problems with abuse. In response, YouTube co-founder Jawed Karim posted the question "why the fuck do I need a google+ account to comment on a video?" on his YouTube channel to express his negative opinion of the change. The official YouTube announcement received 20,097 "thumbs down" votes and generated more than 32,000 comments in two days. Writing in the Newsday blog Silicon Island, Chase Melvin noted that "Google+ is nowhere near as popular a social media network like Facebook, but it's essentially being forced upon millions of YouTube users who don't want to lose their ability to comment on videos" and added that "Discussion forums across the Internet are already bursting with the outcry against the new comment system". In the same article Melvin goes on to say:

Later, on July 27, 2015, Google announced in a blog post that it would be removing the requirement to sign up to a Google+ account to post comments to YouTube. Then on November 3, 2016, YouTube announced a trial scheme which allows the creators of videos to decide whether to approve, hide or report the comments posted on videos based on an algorithm that detects potentially offensive comments. Creators may also choose to keep or delete comments with links or hashtags in order to combat spam. They can also allow other users to moderate their comments.

In December 2020, it was reported that YouTube would launch a new feature that will warn users who post a comment that "may be offensive to others."

Community
On September 13, 2016, YouTube launched a public beta of Community, a social media-based feature that allows users to post text, images (including GIFs), live videos and others in a separate "Community" tab on their channel. Prior to the release, several creators had been consulted to suggest tools Community could incorporate that they would find useful; these YouTubers included Vlogbrothers, AsapScience, Lilly Singh, The Game Theorists, Karmin, The Key of Awesome, The Kloons, Peter Hollens, Rosianna Halse Rojas, Sam Tsui, Threadbanger and Vsauce3.

After the feature has been officially released, the community post feature gets activated automatically for every channel that passes a specific threshold of subscriber counts or already has more subscribers. This threshold was lowered over time, from 10,000 subscribers  to 1500 subscribers, to 1000 subscribers, to 500 subscribers.

Channels that the community tab becomes enabled for, get their channel discussions (previously known as channel comments) permanently erased, instead of co-existing or migrating.

TestTube 
Experimental features of YouTube can be accessed in an area of the site named TestTube.

For example, in October 2009, a comment search feature accessible under /comment_search was implemented as part of this program. The feature was removed later.

Later the same year, YouTube Feather was introduced as a lightweight alternative website for countries with limited internet speeds.

Content accessibility
YouTube offers users the ability to view its videos on web pages outside their website. Each YouTube video is accompanied by a piece of HTML that can be used to embed it on any page on the Web. This functionality is often used to embed YouTube videos in social networking pages and blogs. Users wishing to post a video discussing, inspired by, or related to another user's video can make a "video response". The eleven character YouTube video identifier (64 possible characters used in each position), allows for a theoretical maximum of 6411 or around 73.8 quintillion (73.8 billion billion) unique ids.

YouTube announced that it would remove video responses for being an underused feature on August 27, 2013. Embedding, rating, commenting and response posting can be disabled by the video owner. YouTube does not usually offer a download link for its videos, and intends for them to be viewed through its website interface. A small number of videos can be downloaded as MP4 files. Numerous third-party web sites, applications and browser plug-ins allow users to download YouTube videos.

In February 2009, YouTube announced a test service, allowing some partners to offer video downloads for free or for a fee paid through Google Checkout. In June 2012, Google sent cease and desist letters threatening legal action against several websites offering online download and conversion of YouTube videos. In response, Zamzar removed the ability to download YouTube videos from its site. Users retain copyright of their own work under the default Standard YouTube License, but have the option to grant certain usage rights under any public copyright license they choose.

Since July 2012, it has been possible to select a Creative Commons attribution license as the default, allowing other users to reuse and remix the material.

Platforms
Most modern smartphones are capable of accessing YouTube videos, either within an application or through an optimized website. YouTube Mobile was launched in June 2007, using RTSP streaming for the video. Not all of YouTube's videos are available on the mobile version of the site.

Since June 2007, YouTube's videos have been available for viewing on a range of Apple products. This required YouTube's content to be transcoded into Apple's preferred video standard, H.264, a process that took several months. YouTube videos can be viewed on devices including Apple TV, iPod Touch and the iPhone.

The mobile version of the site was relaunched based on HTML5 in July 2010, avoiding the need to use Adobe Flash Player and optimized for use with touch screen controls. The mobile version is also available as an app for the Android platform.

In September 2012, YouTube launched its first app for the iPhone, following the decision to drop YouTube as one of the preloaded apps in the iPhone 5 and iOS 6 operating system. According to GlobalWebIndex, YouTube was used by 35% of smartphone users between April and June 2013, making it the third-most used app.

A TiVo service update in July 2008 allowed the system to search and play YouTube videos.

In January 2009, YouTube launched "YouTube for TV", a version of the website tailored for set-top boxes and other TV-based media devices with web browsers, initially allowing its videos to be viewed on the PlayStation 3 and Wii video game consoles.

During the month of June that same year, YouTube XL was introduced, which has a simplified interface designed for viewing on a standard television screen. YouTube is also available as an app on Xbox Live.

On November 15, 2012, Google launched an official app for the Wii, allowing users to watch YouTube videos from the Wii channel. An app was available for Wii U and Nintendo 3DS, but was discontinued in August 2019. Videos can also be viewed on the Wii U Internet Browser using HTML5. Google made YouTube available on the Roku player on December 17, 2013, and, in October 2014, the Sony PlayStation 4.

YouTube launched as a downloadable app for the Nintendo Switch in November 2018.

International and localization
On June 19, 2007, Google CEO Eric Schmidt appeared in Paris to launch the new localization system. The interface of the website is available with localized versions in 104 countries, one territory (Hong Kong) and a worldwide version.

The YouTube interface suggests which local version should be chosen based on the IP address of the user. In some cases, the message "This video is not available in your country" may appear because of copyright restrictions or inappropriate content. The interface of the YouTube website is available in 76 language versions, including Amharic, Albanian, Armenian, Burmese, Kyrgyz, Mongolian, Persian and Uzbek, which do not have local channel versions. Access to YouTube was blocked in Turkey between 2008 and 2010, following controversy over the posting of videos deemed insulting to Mustafa Kemal Atatürk and some material offensive to Muslims. In October 2012, a local version of YouTube was launched in Turkey, with the domain youtube.com.tr. The local version is subject to the content regulations found in Turkish law. In March 2009, a dispute between YouTube and the British royalty collection agency PRS for Music led to premium music videos being blocked for YouTube users in the United Kingdom. The removal of videos posted by the major record companies occurred after failure to reach an agreement on a licensing deal. The dispute was resolved in September 2009. In April 2009, a similar dispute led to the removal of premium music videos for users in Germany.

Videos 
In January 2012, it was estimated that visitors to YouTube spent an average of 15 minutes a day on the site, in contrast to the four or five hours a day spent by a typical US citizen watching television. In 2017, viewers on average watched YouTube on mobile devices for more than an hour every day.

In December 2012, two billion views were removed from the view counts of Universal and Sony music videos on YouTube, prompting a claim by The Daily Dot that the views had been deleted due to a violation of the site's terms of service, which ban the use of automated processes to inflate view counts. This was disputed by Billboard, which said that the two billion views had been moved to Vevo, since the videos were no longer active on YouTube. On August 5, 2015, YouTube patched the formerly notorious behaviour which caused a video's view count to freeze at "301" (later "301+") until the actual count was verified to prevent view count fraud. YouTube view counts once again updated in real time.

Since September 2019, subscriber counts are abbreviated. Only three leading digits of channels' subscriber counts are indicated publicly, compromising the function of third-party real-time indicators such as that of Social Blade. Exact counts remain available to channel operators inside YouTube Studio.

On November 11, 2021, after testing out this change in March of the same year, YouTube announced it would start hiding dislike counts on videos, making them invisible to viewers. The company stated the decision was in response to experiments which confirmed that smaller YouTube creators were more likely to be targeted in dislike brigading and harassment. Creators will still be able to see the number of likes and dislikes in the YouTube Studio dashboard tool, according to YouTube.

Copyright issues 

YouTube has faced numerous challenges and criticisms in its attempts to deal with copyright, including the site's first viral video, Lazy Sunday, which had to be taken down, due to copyright concerns. At the time of uploading a video, YouTube users are shown a message asking them not to violate copyright laws. Despite this advice, many unauthorized clips of copyrighted material remain on YouTube. YouTube does not view videos before they are posted online, and it is left to copyright holders to issue a DMCA takedown notice pursuant to the terms of the Online Copyright Infringement Liability Limitation Act. Any successful complaint about copyright infringement results in a YouTube copyright strike. Three successful complaints for copyright infringement against a user account will result in the account and all of its uploaded videos being deleted. From 2007 to 2009 organizations including Viacom, Mediaset, and the English Premier League have filed lawsuits against YouTube, claiming that it has done too little to prevent the uploading of copyrighted material.

In August 2008, a US court ruled in Lenz v. Universal Music Corp. that copyright holders cannot order the removal of an online file without first determining whether the posting reflected fair use of the material. YouTube's owner Google announced in November 2015 that they would help cover the legal cost in select cases where they believe fair use defenses apply.

In the 2011 case of Smith v. Summit Entertainment LLC, professional singer Matt Smith sued Summit Entertainment for the wrongful use of copyright takedown notices on YouTube. He asserted seven causes of action, and four were ruled in Smith's favor. In April 2012, a court in Hamburg ruled that YouTube could be held responsible for copyrighted material posted by its users. On November 1, 2016, the dispute with GEMA was resolved, with Google content ID being used to allow advertisements to be added to videos with content protected by GEMA.

In April 2013, it was reported that Universal Music Group and YouTube have a contractual agreement that prevents content blocked on YouTube by a request from UMG from being restored, even if the uploader of the video files a DMCA counter-notice. As part of YouTube Music, Universal and YouTube signed an agreement in 2017, which was followed by separate agreements other major labels, which gave the company the right to advertising revenue when its music was played on YouTube. By 2019, creators were having videos taken down or demonetized when Content ID identified even short segments of copyrighted music within a much longer video, with different levels of enforcement depending on the record label. Experts noted that some of these clips said qualified for fair use.

Content ID 

In June 2007, YouTube began trials of a system for automatic detection of uploaded videos that infringe copyright. Google CEO Eric Schmidt regarded this system as necessary for resolving lawsuits such as the one from Viacom, which alleged that YouTube profited from content that it did not have the right to distribute. The system, which was initially called "Video Identification" and later became known as Content ID, creates an ID File for copyrighted audio and video material, and stores it in a database. When a video is uploaded, it is checked against the database, and flags the video as a copyright violation if a match is found. When this occurs, the content owner has the choice of blocking the video to make it unviewable, tracking the viewing statistics of the video, or adding advertisements to the video.

An independent test in 2009 uploaded multiple versions of the same song to YouTube and concluded that while the system was "surprisingly resilient" in finding copyright violations in the audio tracks of videos, it was not infallible. The use of Content ID to remove material automatically has led to controversy in some cases, as the videos have not been checked by a human for fair use. If a YouTube user disagrees with a decision by Content ID, it is possible to fill in a form disputing the decision.

Before 2016, videos were not monetized until the dispute was resolved. Since April 2016, videos continue to be monetized while the dispute is in progress, and the money goes to whoever won the dispute. Should the uploader want to monetize the video again, they may remove the disputed audio in the "Video Manager". YouTube has cited the effectiveness of Content ID as one of the reasons why the site's rules were modified in December 2010 to allow some users to upload videos of unlimited length.

Moderation and offensive content

YouTube has a set of community guidelines aimed to reduce abuse of the site's features. The uploading of videos containing defamation, pornography, and material encouraging criminal conduct is forbidden by YouTube's "Community Guidelines". Generally prohibited material includes sexually explicit content, videos of animal abuse, shock videos, content uploaded without the copyright holder's consent, hate speech, spam, and predatory behavior. YouTube relies on its users to flag the content of videos as inappropriate, and a YouTube employee will view a flagged video to determine whether it violates the site's guidelines. Despite the guidelines, YouTube has faced criticism over aspects of its operations, its recommendation algorithms perpetuating videos that promote conspiracy theories and falsehoods, hosting videos ostensibly targeting children but containing violent or sexually suggestive content involving popular characters, videos of minors attracting pedophilic activities in their comment sections, and fluctuating policies on the types of content that is eligible to be monetized with advertising.

YouTube contracts companies to hire content moderators, who view content flagged as potentially violating YouTube's content policies and determines if they should be removed. In September 2020, a class-action suit was filed by a former content moderator who reported developing post-traumatic stress disorder (PTSD) after an 18-month period on the job. The former content moderator said that she was regularly made to exceed YouTube's stated limit of four hours per day of viewing graphic content. The lawsuit alleges that YouTube's contractors gave little to no training or support for its moderators' mental health, made prospective employees sign NDAs before showing them any examples of content they would see while reviewing, and censored all mention of trauma from its internal forums. It also purports that requests for extremely graphic content to be blurred, reduced in size or made monochrome, per recommendations from the National Center for Missing and Exploited Children, were rejected by YouTube as not a high priority for the company.

To limit the spread of misinformation and fake news via YouTube, it has rolled out a comprehensive policy regarding how it plans to deal with technically manipulated videos.

Controversial content has included material relating to Holocaust denial and the Hillsborough disaster, in which 96 football fans from Liverpool were crushed to death in 1989. In July 2008, the Culture and Media Committee of the House of Commons of the United Kingdom stated that it was "unimpressed" with YouTube's system for policing its videos, and argued that "proactive review of content should be standard practice for sites hosting user-generated content". YouTube responded by stating:

In October 2010, U.S. Congressman Anthony Weiner urged YouTube to remove from its website videos of imam Anwar al-Awlaki. YouTube pulled some of the videos in November 2010, stating they violated the site's guidelines. In December 2010, YouTube added the ability to flag videos for containing terrorism content.

In 2018, YouTube introduced a system that would automatically add information boxes to videos that its algorithms determined may present conspiracy theories and other fake news, filling the infobox with content from Encyclopædia Britannica and Wikipedia as a means to inform users to minimize misinformation propagation without impacting freedom of speech. In the wake of the Notre-Dame fire on April 15, 2019, several user-uploaded videos of the landmark fire were flagged by YouTube' system automatically with an Encyclopædia Britannica article on the false conspiracy theories around the September 11 attacks. Several users complained to YouTube about this inappropriate connection. YouTube officials apologized for this, stating that their algorithms had misidentified the fire videos and added the information block automatically, and were taking steps to remedy this.

Homophobia and transphobia 
Five leading content creators whose channels were based on LGBTQ+ materials filed a federal lawsuit against YouTube in August 2019, alleging that YouTube's algorithms divert discovery away from their channels, impacting their revenue. The plaintiffs claimed that the algorithms discourage content with words like "lesbian" or "gay", which would be predominant in their channels' content, and because of YouTube's near-monopolization of online video services, they are abusing that position.

In June 2022, Media Matters, a media watchdog group, reported that homophobic and transphobic content calling LGBT people "predators" and "groomers" was becoming more common on YouTube. The report also referred to common accusations in YouTube videos that LGBT people are mentally ill. The report stated the content appeared to be in violation of YouTube's hate speech policy.

YouTube as a tool to promote conspiracy theories and far-right content
YouTube has been criticized for using an algorithm that gives great prominence to videos that promote conspiracy theories, falsehoods and incendiary fringe discourse. According to an investigation by The Wall Street Journal, "YouTube's recommendations often lead users to channels that feature conspiracy theories, partisan viewpoints and misleading videos, even when those users haven't shown interest in such content. When users show a political bias in what they choose to view, YouTube typically recommends videos that echo those biases, often with more-extreme viewpoints." When users search for political or scientific terms, YouTube's search algorithms often give prominence to hoaxes and conspiracy theories. After YouTube drew controversy for giving top billing to videos promoting falsehoods and conspiracy when people made breaking-news queries during the 2017 Las Vegas shooting, YouTube changed its algorithm to give greater prominence to mainstream media sources. In 2018, it was reported that YouTube was again promoting fringe content about breaking news, giving great prominence to conspiracy videos about Anthony Bourdain's death.

In 2017, it was revealed that advertisements were being placed on extremist videos, including videos by rape apologists, anti-Semites, and hate preachers who received ad payouts. After firms started to stop advertising on YouTube in the wake of this reporting, YouTube apologized and said that it would give firms greater control over where ads got placed.

Alex Jones, known for right-wing conspiracy theories, had built a massive audience on YouTube. YouTube drew criticism in 2018 when it removed a video from Media Matters compiling offensive statements made by Jones, stating that it violated its policies on "harassment and bullying". On August 6, 2018, however, YouTube removed Alex Jones' YouTube page following a content violation.

University of North Carolina professor Zeynep Tufekci has referred to YouTube as "The Great Radicalizer", saying "YouTube may be one of the most powerful radicalizing instruments of the 21st century." Jonathan Albright of the Tow Center for Digital Journalism at Columbia University described YouTube as a "conspiracy ecosystem".

In January 2019, YouTube said that it had introduced a new policy starting in the United States intended to stop recommending videos containing "content that could misinform users in harmful ways." YouTube gave flat earth theories, miracle cures, and 9/11 trutherism as examples. Efforts within YouTube engineering to stop recommending borderline extremist videos falling just short of forbidden hate speech, and track their popularity were originally rejected because they could interfere with viewer engagement. In late 2019, the site began implementing measures directed towards "raising authoritative content and reducing borderline content and harmful misinformation."

Multiple research studies have investigated cases of misinformation in YouTube. In a July 2019 study based on ten YouTube searches using the Tor Browser related to climate and climate change, the majority of videos were videos that communicated views contrary to the scientific consensus on climate change. A 2019 BBC investigation of YouTube searches in ten different languages found that YouTube's algorithm promoted health misinformation, including fake cancer cures. In Brazil, YouTube has been linked to pushing pseudoscientific misinformation on health matters, as well as elevated far-right fringe discourse and conspiracy theories. In the Philippines, numerous channels disseminated misinformation related to the 2022 Philippine elections. Additionally, research on the dissemination of Flat Earth beliefs in social media, has shown that networks of YouTube channels form an echo chamber that polarizes audiences by appearing to confirm preexisting beliefs.

Use among white supremacists 
Before 2019, YouTube has taken steps to remove specific videos or channels related to supremacist content that had violated its acceptable use policies but otherwise did not have site-wide policies against hate speech.

In the wake of the March 2019 Christchurch mosque attacks, YouTube and other sites like Facebook and Twitter that allowed user-submitted content drew criticism for doing little to moderate and control the spread of hate speech, which was considered to be a factor in the rationale for the attacks. These platforms were pressured to remove such content, but in an interview with The New York Times, YouTube's chief product officer Neal Mohan said that unlike content such as ISIS videos which take a particular format and thus easy to detect through computer-aided algorithms, general hate speech was more difficult to recognize and handle, and thus could not readily take action to remove without human interaction.

YouTube joined an initiative led by France and New Zealand with other countries and tech companies in May 2019 to develop tools to be used to block online hate speech and to develop regulations, to be implemented at the national level, to be levied against technology firms that failed to take steps to remove such speech, though the United States declined to participate. Subsequently, on June 5, 2019, YouTube announced a major change to its terms of service, "specifically prohibiting videos alleging that a group is superior in order to justify discrimination, segregation or exclusion based on qualities like age, gender, race, caste, religion, sexual orientation or veteran status." YouTube identified specific examples of such videos as those that "promote or glorify Nazi ideology, which is inherently discriminatory". YouTube further stated it would "remove content denying that well-documented violent events, like the Holocaust or the shooting at Sandy Hook Elementary, took place."

In June 2020, YouTube banned several channels associated with white supremacy, including those of Stefan Molyneux, David Duke, and Richard B. Spencer, asserting these channels violated their policies on hate speech. The ban occurred the same day that Reddit announced the ban on several hate speech sub-forums including r/The_Donald.

Handling of COVID-19 pandemic and other misinformation 
Following the dissemination via YouTube of misinformation related to the COVID-19 pandemic that 5G communications technology was responsible for the spread of coronavirus disease 2019 which led to multiple 5G towers in the United Kingdom being attacked by arsonists, YouTube removed all such videos linking 5G and the coronavirus in this manner.

YouTube extended this policy in September 2021 to cover videos disseminating misinformation related to any vaccine, including those long approved against measles or Hepatitis B, that had received approval from local health authorities or the World Health Organization. The platform removed the accounts of anti-vaccine campaigners such as Robert F. Kennedy Jr. and Joseph Mercola at this time. Two accounts linked to RT Deutsch, the German channel of the Russian RT network were removed as well for breaching YouTube's policies.

Google and YouTube implemented policies in October 2021 to deny monetization or revenue to advertisers or content creators that promoted climate change denial, which "includes content referring to climate change as a hoax or a scam, claims denying that long-term trends show the global climate is warming, and claims denying that greenhouse gas emissions or human activity contribute to climate change."

In July 2022 YouTube announced policies to combat misinformation surrounding abortion, such as videos with instructions to perform abortion methods that are considered unsafe and videos that contain misinformation about the safety of abortion.

Child safety and wellbeing

Leading into 2017, there was a significant increase in the number of videos related to children, coupled between the popularity of parents vlogging their family's activities, and previous content creators moving away from content that often was criticized or demonetized into family-friendly material. In 2017, YouTube reported that time watching family vloggers had increased by 90%. However, with the increase in videos featuring children, the site began to face several controversies related to child safety. During Q2 2017, the owners of popular channel FamilyOFive, which featured themselves playing "pranks" on their children, were accused of child abuse. Their videos were eventually deleted, and two of their children were removed from their custody. A similar case happened in 2019 when the owners of the channel Fantastic Adventures was accused of abusing her adopted children. Her videos would later be deleted.

Later that year, YouTube came under criticism for showing inappropriate videos targeted at children and often featuring popular characters in violent, sexual or otherwise disturbing situations, many of which appeared on YouTube Kids and attracted millions of views. The term "Elsagate" was coined on the Internet and then used by various news outlets to refer to this controversy. On November 11, 2017, YouTube announced it was strengthening site security to protect children from unsuitable content. Later that month, the company started to mass delete videos and channels that made improper use of family-friendly characters. As part of a broader concern regarding child safety on YouTube, the wave of deletions also targeted channels that showed children taking part in inappropriate or dangerous activities under the guidance of adults. Most notably, the company removed Toy Freaks, a channel with over 8.5 million subscribers, that featured a father and his two daughters in odd and upsetting situations. According to analytics specialist SocialBlade, it earned up to £8.7 million annually prior to its deletion.

Even for content that appears to be aimed at children and appears to contain only child-friendly content, YouTube's system allows for anonymity of who uploads these videos. These questions have been raised in the past, as YouTube has had to remove channels with children's content which, after becoming popular, then suddenly include inappropriate content masked as children's content. Alternative, some of the most-watched children's programming on YouTube comes from channels that have no identifiable owners, raising concerns of intent and purpose. One channel that had been of concern was "Cocomelon" which provided numerous mass-produced animated videos aimed at children. Up through 2019, it had drawn up to  a month in ad revenue and was one of the largest kid-friendly channels on YouTube before 2020. Ownership of Cocomelon was unclear outside of its ties to "Treasure Studio", itself an unknown entity, raising questions as to the channel's purpose, but Bloomberg News had been able to confirm and interview the small team of American owners in February 2020 regarding "Cocomelon", who stated their goal for the channel was to simply entertain children, wanting to keep to themselves to avoid attention from outside investors. The anonymity of such channel raise concerns because of the lack of knowledge of what purpose they are trying to serve. The difficulty to identify who operates these channels "adds to the lack of accountability", according to Josh Golin of the Campaign for a Commercial-Free Childhood, and educational consultant Renée Chernow-O'Leary found the videos were designed to entertain with no intent to educate, all leading to both critics and parents to be concerned for their children becoming too enraptured by the content from these channels. Content creators that earnestly make kid-friendly videos have found it difficult to compete with larger channels like ChuChu TV, unable to produce content at the same rate as these large channels, and lack the same means of being promoted through YouTube's recommendation algorithms that the larger animated channel networks have shared.

In January 2019, YouTube officially banned videos containing "challenges that encourage acts that have an inherent risk of severe physical harm" (such as, for example, the Tide Pod Challenge) and videos featuring pranks that "make victims believe they're in physical danger" or cause emotional distress in children.

Sexualization of children and pedophilia 

Also in November 2017, it was revealed in the media that many videos featuring children—often uploaded by the minors themselves, and showing innocent content such as the children playing with toys or performing gymnastics—were attracting comments from pedophiles with predators finding the videos through private YouTube playlists or typing in certain keywords in Russian. Other child-centric videos originally uploaded to YouTube began propagating on the dark web, and uploaded or embedded onto forums known to be used by pedophiles.

As a result of the controversy, which added to the concern about "Elsagate", several major advertisers whose ads had been running against such videos froze spending on YouTube. In December 2018, The Times found more than 100 grooming cases in which children were manipulated into sexually implicit behavior (such as taking off clothes, adopting overtly sexual poses and touching other children inappropriately) by strangers. After a reporter flagged the videos in question, half of them were removed, and the rest were removed after The Times contacted YouTube's PR department.

In February 2019, YouTube vlogger Matt Watson identified a "wormhole" that would cause the YouTube recommendation algorithm to draw users into this type of video content, and make all of that user's recommended content feature only these types of videos. Most of these videos had comments from sexual predators commenting with timestamps of when the children were shown in compromising positions or otherwise making indecent remarks. In some cases, other users had re-uploaded the video in unlisted form but with incoming links from other videos, and then monetized these, propagating this network. In the wake of the controversy, the service reported that they had deleted over 400 channels and tens of millions of comments, and reported the offending users to law enforcement and the National Center for Missing and Exploited Children. A spokesperson explained that "any content—including comments—that endangers minors is abhorrent and we have clear policies prohibiting this on YouTube. There's more to be done, and we continue to work to improve and catch abuse more quickly." Despite these measures, AT&T, Disney, Dr. Oetker, Epic Games, and Nestlé all pulled their advertising from YouTube.

Subsequently, YouTube began to demonetize and block advertising on the types of videos that have drawn these predatory comments. The service explained that this was a temporary measure while they explore other methods to eliminate the problem. YouTube also began to flag channels that predominantly feature children, and preemptively disable their comments sections. "Trusted partners" can request that comments be re-enabled, but the channel will then become responsible for moderating comments. These actions mainly target videos of toddlers, but videos of older children and teenagers may be protected as well if they contain actions that can be interpreted as sexual, such as gymnastics. YouTube stated it was also working on a better system to remove comments on other channels that matched the style of child predators.

A related attempt to algorithmically flag videos containing references to the string "CP" (an abbreviation of child pornography) resulted in some prominent false positives involving unrelated topics using the same abbreviation, including videos related to the mobile video game Pokémon Go (which uses "CP" as an abbreviation of the statistic "Combat Power"), and Club Penguin. YouTube apologized for the errors and reinstated the affected videos. Separately, online trolls have attempted to have videos flagged for takedown or removal by commenting with statements similar to what the child predators had said; this activity became an issue during the PewDiePie vs T-Series rivalry in early 2019. YouTube stated they do not take action on any video with these comments but those that they have flagged that are likely to draw child predator activity.

In June 2019, The New York Times cited researchers who found that users who watched erotic videos could be recommended seemingly innocuous videos of children. As a result, Senator Josh Hawley stated plans to introduce federal legislation that would ban YouTube and other video sharing sites from including videos that predominantly feature minors as "recommended" videos, excluding those that were "professionally produced", such as videos of televised talent shows. YouTube has suggested potential plans to remove all videos featuring children from the main YouTube site and transferring them to the YouTube Kids site where they would have stronger controls over the recommendation system, as well as other major changes on the main YouTube site to the recommended feature and autoplay system.

Misogyny 
A January 2022 report by the social media analytics firm Bot Sentinel said that several online influencers were using YouTube to exclusively post negative content about Prince Harry and Meghan, including conspiracy theories about the couple, in what it called "a lucrative hate-for-profit enterprise" where "racism and YouTube ad revenue are the primary motivators." Bot Sentinel also found that one of the most prominent accounts promoting a conspiracy theory that Meghan was never pregnant had accumulated nearly 19 million views and was earning around $44,000 a year. YouTube banned the account in March.

An August 2022 report by the Center for Countering Digital Hate, a British think tank, found that harassment against women was flourishing on YouTube. It noted that channels espousing a similar ideology to that of men's rights influencer Andrew Tate were using YouTube to grow their audience, despite Tate being banned from the platform. In his 2022 book Like, Comment, Subscribe: Inside YouTube's Chaotic Rise to World Domination, Bloomberg reporter Mark Bergen said that many female content creators were dealing with harassment, bullying and stalking.

April Fools gags

YouTube featured an April Fools prank on the site on April 1 of every year from 2008 to 2016. In 2008, all links to videos on the main page were redirected to Rick Astley's music video "Never Gonna Give You Up", a prank known as "rickrolling". The next year, when clicking on a video on the main page, the whole page turned upside down, which YouTube claimed was a "new layout". In 2010, YouTube temporarily released a "TEXTp" mode which rendered video imagery into ASCII art letters "in order to reduce bandwidth costs by $1 per second."

The next year, the site celebrated its "100th anniversary" with a range of sepia-toned silent, early 1900s-style films, including a parody of Keyboard Cat. In 2012, clicking on the image of a DVD next to the site logo led to a video about a purported option to order every YouTube video for home delivery on DVD.

In 2013, YouTube teamed up with satirical newspaper company The Onion to claim in an uploaded video that the video-sharing website was launched as a contest which had finally come to an end, and would shut down for ten years before being re-launched in 2023, featuring only the winning video. The video starred several YouTube celebrities, including Antoine Dodson. A video of two presenters announcing the nominated videos streamed live for 12 hours.

In 2014, YouTube announced that it was responsible for the creation of all viral video trends, and revealed previews of upcoming trends, such as "Clocking", "Kissing Dad", and "Glub Glub Water Dance". The next year, YouTube added a music button to the video bar that played samples from "Sandstorm" by Darude. In 2016, YouTube introduced an option to watch every video on the platform in 360-degree mode with Snoop Dogg.

Services

YouTube Premium

YouTube Premium (formerly YouTube Red) is YouTube's premium subscription service. It offers advertising-free streaming, access to original programming, and background and offline video playback on mobile devices. YouTube Premium was originally announced on November 12, 2014, as "Music Key", a subscription music streaming service, and was intended to integrate with and replace the existing Google Play Music "All Access" service. On October 28, 2015, the service was relaunched as YouTube Red, offering ad-free streaming of all videos and access to exclusive original content. , the service has 1.5 million subscribers, with a further million on a free-trial basis. , the first season of YouTube Originals had gotten 250 million views in total.

YouTube Kids 

YouTube Kids is an American children's video app developed by YouTube, a subsidiary of Google. The app was developed in response to parental and government scrutiny on the content available to children. The app provides a version of the service-oriented towards children, with curated selections of content, parental control features, and filtering of videos deemed inappropriate viewing for children aged under 13, 8 or 5 depending on the age grouping chosen. First released on February 15, 2015, as an Android and iOS mobile app, the app has since been released for LG, Samsung, and Sony smart TVs, as well as for Android TV. On May 27, 2020, it became available on Apple TV. As of September 2019, the app is available in 69 countries, including Hong Kong and Macau, and one province. YouTube launched a web-based version of YouTube Kids on August 30, 2019.

YouTube Music 

On September 28, 2016, YouTube named Lyor Cohen, the co-founder of 300 Entertainment and former Warner Music Group executive, the Global Head of Music.

In early 2018, Cohen began hinting at the possible launch of YouTube's new subscription music streaming service, a platform that would compete with other services such as Spotify and Apple Music. On May 22, 2018, the music streaming platform named "YouTube Music" was launched.

YouTube Movies
YouTube Movies is a service by YouTube that shows movies via its website. Around 100–500 movies are free to view, with ads. Some new movies get added and some get removed, unannounced at a new month.

YouTube TV

On February 28, 2017, in a press announcement held at YouTube Space Los Angeles, YouTube announced YouTube TV, an over-the-top MVPD-style subscription service that would be available for United States customers at a price of US$65 per month. Initially launching in five major markets (New York City, Los Angeles, Chicago, Philadelphia and San Francisco) on April 5, 2017, the service offers live streams of programming from the five major broadcast networks (ABC, CBS, The CW, Fox and NBC), as well as approximately 40 cable channels owned by the corporate parents of those networks, The Walt Disney Company, CBS Corporation, 21st Century Fox, NBCUniversal and Turner Broadcasting System (including among others Bravo, USA Network, Syfy, Disney Channel, CNN, Cartoon Network, E!, Fox Sports 1, Freeform, FX and ESPN). Subscribers can also receive Showtime and Fox Soccer Plus as optional add-ons for an extra fee, and can access YouTube Premium original content.

YouTube Go

YouTube Go was an Android app created for making YouTube easier to access on mobile devices in emerging markets. It was distinct from the company's main Android app and allowed videos to be downloaded and shared with other users. It also allowed users to preview videos, share downloaded videos through Bluetooth, and offered more options for mobile data control and video resolution. In May 2022, Google announced that they would be shutting down YouTube Go in August 2022.

YouTube announced the project in September 2016 at an event in India. It was launched in India in February 2017, and expanded in November 2017 to 14 other countries, including Nigeria, Indonesia, Thailand, Malaysia, Vietnam, the Philippines, Kenya, and South Africa. It was rolled out in 130 countries worldwide, including Brazil, Mexico, Turkey, and Iraq on February 1, 2018. Before it shut down, the app was available to around 60% of the world's population.

YouTube Shorts 

In September 2020, YouTube announced that it would be launching a beta version of a new platform of 15-second videos, similar to TikTok, called YouTube Shorts. The platform was first tested in India but as of March 2021 has expanded to other countries including the United States with videos now able to be up to 1 minute long. The platform is not a standalone app, but is integrated into the main YouTube app. Like TikTok, it gives users access to built-in creative tools, including the possibility of adding licensed music to their videos. The platform had its global beta launch in July 2021.

YouTube Stories 
In 2018, YouTube started testing a new feature initially called "YouTube Reels". The feature is nearly identical to Instagram Stories and Snapchat Stories. YouTube later renamed the feature "YouTube Stories". It is only available to creators who have more than 10,000 subscribers and can only be posted/seen in the YouTube mobile app.

Social impact

Both private individuals and large production corporations have used YouTube to grow audiences. Indie creators have built grassroots followings numbering in the thousands at very little cost or effort, while mass retail and radio promotion proved problematic. Concurrently, old media celebrities moved into the website at the invitation of a YouTube management that witnessed early content creators accruing substantial followings and perceived audience sizes potentially larger than that attainable by television. While YouTube's revenue-sharing "Partner Program" made it possible to earn a substantial living as a video producer—its top five hundred partners each earning more than $100,000 annually and its ten highest-earning channels grossing from $2.5 million to $12 million—in 2012 CMU business editor characterized YouTube as "a free-to-use ... promotional platform for the music labels." In 2013 Forbes Katheryn Thayer asserted that digital-era artists' work must not only be of high quality, but must elicit reactions on the YouTube platform and social media. Videos of the 2.5% of artists categorized as "mega", "mainstream" and "mid-sized" received 90.3% of the relevant views on YouTube and Vevo in that year. By early 2013, Billboard had announced that it was factoring YouTube streaming data into calculation of the Billboard Hot 100 and related genre charts.

Observing that face-to-face communication of the type that online videos convey has been "fine-tuned by millions of years of evolution," TED curator Chris Anderson referred to several YouTube contributors and asserted that "what Gutenberg did for writing, online video can now do for face-to-face communication." Anderson asserted that it is not far-fetched to say that online video will dramatically accelerate scientific advance, and that video contributors may be about to launch "the biggest learning cycle in human history." In education, for example, the Khan Academy grew from YouTube video tutoring sessions for founder Salman Khan's cousin into what Forbes Michael Noer called "the largest school in the world," with technology poised to disrupt how people learn. YouTube was awarded a 2008 George Foster Peabody Award, the website being described as a Speakers' Corner that "both embodies and promotes democracy." The Washington Post reported that a disproportionate share of YouTube's most subscribed channels feature minorities, contrasting with mainstream television in which the stars are largely white. A Pew Research Center study reported the development of "visual journalism," in which citizen eyewitnesses and established news organizations share in content creation. The study also concluded that YouTube was becoming an important platform by which people acquire news.

YouTube has enabled people to more directly engage with government, such as in the CNN/YouTube presidential debates (2007) in which ordinary people submitted questions to U.S. presidential candidates via YouTube video, with a techPresident co-founder saying that Internet video was changing the political landscape. Describing the Arab Spring (2010–2012), sociologist Philip N. Howard quoted an activist's succinct description that organizing the political unrest involved using "Facebook to schedule the protests, Twitter to coordinate, and YouTube to tell the world." In 2012, more than a third of the U.S. Senate introduced a resolution condemning Joseph Kony 16 days after the "Kony 2012" video was posted to YouTube, with resolution co-sponsor Senator Lindsey Graham remarking that the video "will do more to lead to (Kony's) demise than all other action combined."

Conversely, YouTube has also allowed government to more easily engage with citizens, the White House's official YouTube channel being the seventh top news organization producer on YouTube in 2012 and in 2013 a healthcare exchange commissioned Obama impersonator Iman Crosson's YouTube music video spoof to encourage young Americans to enroll in the Affordable Care Act (Obamacare)-compliant health insurance. In February 2014, U.S. President Obama held a meeting at the White House with leading YouTube content creators to not only promote awareness of Obamacare but more generally to develop ways for government to better connect with the "YouTube Generation." Whereas YouTube's inherent ability to allow presidents to directly connect with average citizens was noted, the YouTube content creators' new media savvy was perceived necessary to better cope with the website's distracting content and fickle audience.

Some YouTube videos have themselves had a direct effect on world events, such as Innocence of Muslims (2012) which spurred protests and related anti-American violence internationally. TED curator Chris Anderson described a phenomenon by which geographically distributed individuals in a certain field share their independently developed skills in YouTube videos, thus challenging others to improve their own skills, and spurring invention and evolution in that field. Journalist Virginia Heffernan stated in The New York Times that such videos have "surprising implications" for the dissemination of culture and even the future of classical music.

A 2017 article in The New York Times Magazine posited that YouTube had become "the new talk radio" for the far right. Almost a year before YouTube's January 2019 announcement that it would begin a "gradual change" of "reducing recommendations of borderline content and content that could misinform users in harmful ways", Zeynep Tufekci had written in The New York Times that, "(g)iven its billion or so users, YouTube may be one of the most powerful radicalizing instruments of the 21st century". Under YouTube's changes to its recommendation engine, the most recommended channel evolved from conspiracy theorist Alex Jones (2016) to Fox News (2019). According to a 2020 study, "An emerging journalistic consensus theorizes the central role played by the video 'recommendation engine,' but we believe that this is premature. Instead, we propose the 'Supply and Demand' framework for analyzing politics on YouTube." A 2022 study found that "despite widespread concerns that YouTube's algorithms send people down 'rabbit holes' with recommendations to extremist videos, little systematic evidence exists to support this conjecture", "exposure to alternative and extremist channel videos on YouTube is heavily concentrated among a small group of people with high prior levels of gender and racial resentment.", and "contrary to the 'rabbit holes' narrative, non-subscribers are rarely recommended videos from alternative and extremist channels and seldom follow such recommendations when offered."

The Legion of Extraordinary Dancers and the YouTube Symphony Orchestra selected their membership based on individual video performances. Further, the cybercollaboration charity video "We Are the World 25 for Haiti (YouTube edition)" was formed by mixing performances of 57 globally distributed singers into a single musical work, with The Tokyo Times noting the "We Pray for You" YouTube cyber-collaboration video as an example of a trend to use crowdsourcing for charitable purposes.
The anti-bullying It Gets Better Project expanded from a single YouTube video directed to discouraged or suicidal LGBT teens, that within two months drew video responses from hundreds including U.S. President Barack Obama, Vice President Biden, White House staff, and several cabinet secretaries. Similarly, in response to fifteen-year-old Amanda Todd's video "My story: Struggling, bullying, suicide, self-harm," legislative action was undertaken almost immediately after her suicide to study the prevalence of bullying and form a national anti-bullying strategy. In May 2018, after London Metropolitan Police claimed that drill music videos glamorizing violence gave rise to gang violence, YouTube deleted 30 videos.

Finances
Prior to 2020, Google did not provide detailed figures for YouTube's running costs, and YouTube's revenues in 2007 were noted as "not material" in a regulatory filing. In June 2008, a Forbes magazine article projected the 2008 revenue at $200 million, noting progress in advertising sales. In 2012, YouTube's revenue from its ads program was estimated at $3.7 billion. In 2013 it nearly doubled and estimated to hit $5.6 billion according to eMarketer, while others estimated $4.7 billion. The vast majority of videos on YouTube are free to view and supported by advertising. In May 2013, YouTube introduced a trial scheme of 53 subscription channels with prices ranging from $0.99 to $6.99 a month. The move was seen as an attempt to compete with other providers of online subscription services such as Netflix, Amazon Prime, and Hulu.

Google first published exact revenue numbers for YouTube in February 2020 as part of Alphabet's 2019 financial report. YouTube's revenues made up nearly 10% of the total Alphabet revenue in 2019. These revenues accounted for approximately 20 million subscribers combined between YouTube Premium and YouTube Music subscriptions, and 2 million subscribers to YouTube TV.

YouTube had $19.8 billion in revenue in 2020.

Partnership with corporations
YouTube entered into a marketing and advertising partnership with NBC in June 2006. In March 2007, it struck a deal with BBC for three channels with BBC content, one for news and two for entertainment. In November 2008, YouTube reached an agreement with MGM, Lions Gate Entertainment, and CBS, allowing the companies to post full-length films and television episodes on the site, accompanied by advertisements in a section for U.S. viewers called "Shows". The move was intended to create competition with websites such as Hulu, which features material from NBC, Fox, and Disney. In November 2009, YouTube launched a version of "Shows" available to UK viewers, offering around 4,000 full-length shows from more than 60 partners. In January 2010, YouTube introduced an online film rentals service, which is only available to users in the United States, Canada, and the UK as of 2010. The service offers over 6,000 films.

2017 advertiser boycott 
In March 2017, the government of the United Kingdom pulled its advertising campaigns from YouTube, after reports that its ads had appeared on videos containing extremist content. The government demanded assurances that its advertising would "be delivered safely and appropriately". The Guardian newspaper, as well as other major British and U.S. brands, similarly suspended their advertising on YouTube in response to their advertising appearing near offensive content. Google stated that it had "begun an extensive review of our advertising policies and have made a public commitment to put in place changes that give brands more control over where their ads appear". In early April 2017, the YouTube channel h3h3Productions presented evidence claiming that a Wall Street Journal article had fabricated screenshots showing major brand advertising on an offensive video containing Johnny Rebel music overlaid on a Chief Keef music video, citing that the video itself had not earned any ad revenue for the uploader. The video was retracted after it was found that the ads had been triggered by the use of copyrighted content in the video.

On April 6, 2017, YouTube announced that to "ensure revenue only flows to creators who are playing by the rules", it would change its practices to require that a channel undergo a policy compliance review, and have at least 10,000-lifetime views, before they may join the Partner Program.

YouTuber earnings

In May 2007, YouTube launched its Partner Program (YPP), a system based on AdSense which allows the uploader of the video to share the revenue produced by advertising on the site. YouTube typically takes 45 percent of the advertising revenue from videos in the Partner Program, with 55 percent going to the uploader.

There are over a million members of the YouTube Partner Program. According to TubeMogul, in 2013 a pre-roll advertisement on YouTube (one that is shown before the video starts) cost advertisers on average $7.60 per 1000 views. Usually no more than half of the eligible videos have a pre-roll advertisement, due to a lack of interested advertisers.

YouTube policies restrict certain forms of content from being included in videos being monetized with advertising, including videos containing violence, strong language, sexual content, "controversial or sensitive subjects and events, including subjects related to war, political conflicts, natural disasters and tragedies, even if graphic imagery is not shown" (unless the content is "usually newsworthy or comedic and the creator's intent is to inform or entertain"), and videos whose user comments contain "inappropriate" content.

In 2013, YouTube introduced an option for channels with at least a thousand subscribers to require a paid subscription in order for viewers to watch videos. In April 2017, YouTube set an eligibility requirement of 10,000 lifetime views for a paid subscription. On January 16, 2018, the eligibility requirement for monetization was changed to 4,000 hours of watch-time within the past 12 months and 1,000 subscribers. The move was seen as an attempt to ensure that videos being monetized did not lead to controversy, but was criticized for penalizing smaller YouTube channels.

YouTube Play Buttons, a part of the YouTube Creator Rewards, are a recognition by YouTube of its most popular channels. The trophies made of nickel plated copper-nickel alloy, golden plated brass, silver plated metal, ruby, and red tinted crystal glass are given to channels with at least one hundred thousand, a million, ten million, fifty million subscribers, and one hundred million subscribers, respectively.

YouTube's policies on "advertiser-friendly content" restrict what may be incorporated into videos being monetized; this includes strong violence, language, sexual content, and "controversial or sensitive subjects and events, including subjects related to war, political conflicts, natural disasters and tragedies, even if graphic imagery is not shown", unless the content is "usually newsworthy or comedic and the creator's intent is to inform or entertain". In September 2016, after introducing an enhanced notification system to inform users of these violations, YouTube's policies were criticized by prominent users, including Phillip DeFranco and Vlogbrothers. DeFranco argued that not being able to earn advertising revenue on such videos was "censorship by a different name". A YouTube spokesperson stated that while the policy itself was not new, the service had "improved the notification and appeal process to ensure better communication to our creators". Boing Boing reported in 2019 that LGBT keywords resulted in demonetization.

As of November 2020 in the United States and June 2021 worldwide, YouTube reserves the right to monetize any video on the platform, even if their uploader is not a member of the YouTube Partner Program. This will occur on channels whose content is deemed "advertiser-friendly", and all revenue will go directly to Google without any share given to the uploader.

Revenue to copyright holders

The majority of YouTube's advertising revenue goes to the publishers and video producers who hold the rights to their videos; the company retains 45% of the ad revenue. In 2010, it was reported that nearly a third of the videos with advertisements were uploaded without permission of the copyright holders. YouTube gives an option for copyright holders to locate and remove their videos or to have them continue running for revenue. In May 2013, Nintendo began enforcing its copyright ownership and claiming the advertising revenue from video creators who posted screenshots of its games. In February 2015, Nintendo agreed to share the revenue with the video creators through the Nintendo Creators Program. On March 20, 2019, Nintendo announced on Twitter that the company will end the Creators program. Operations for the program ceased on March 20, 2019.

Censorship and bans

YouTube has been censored, filtered, or banned for a variety of reasons, including:
 Limiting public access and exposure to content that may ignite social or political unrest.
 Preventing criticism of a ruler (e.g. in North Korea), government (e.g. in China) or its actions (e.g. in Morocco), government officials (e.g. in Turkey and Libya), or religion (e.g. in Pakistan).
 Morality-based laws, e.g. in Iran.
Access to specific videos is sometimes prevented due to copyright and intellectual property protection laws (e.g. in Germany), violations of hate speech, and preventing access to videos judged inappropriate for youth, which is also done by YouTube with the YouTube Kids app and with "restricted mode". Businesses, schools, government agencies, and other private institutions often block social media sites, including YouTube, due to its bandwidth limitations and the site's potential for distraction.

, public access to YouTube is blocked in many countries, including China, North Korea, Iran, Turkmenistan, Uzbekistan, Tajikistan, Eritrea, Sudan and South Sudan. In some countries, YouTube is blocked for more limited periods of time such as during periods of unrest, the run-up to an election, or in response to upcoming political anniversaries. In cases where the entire site is banned due to one particular video, YouTube will often agree to remove or limit access to that video in order to restore service.

Reports emerged that since October 2019, comments posted with Chinese characters insulting the Chinese Communist Party (共匪 or "communist bandit") or (五毛 or "50 Cent Party", referring to state-sponsored commentators) were being automatically deleted within 15 seconds.

Specific incidents where YouTube has been blocked include:
 Thailand blocked access in April 2007 over a video said to be insulting the Thai king.
 Morocco blocked access in May 2007, possibly as a result of videos critical of Morocco's occupation of Western Sahara. YouTube became accessible again on May 30, 2007, after Maroc Telecom unofficially announced that the denied access to the website was a mere "technical glitch".
 Turkey blocked access between 2008 and 2010 after controversy over videos deemed insulting to Mustafa Kemal Atatürk. In November 2010, a video of the Turkish politician Deniz Baykal caused the site to be blocked again briefly, and the site was threatened with a new shutdown if it did not remove the video. During the two and a half-year block of YouTube, the video-sharing website remained the eighth-most-accessed site in Turkey. In 2014, Turkey blocked the access for the second time, after "a high-level intelligence leak."
 Pakistan blocked access on February 23, 2008, because of "offensive material" towards the Islamic faith, including display of the Danish cartoons of Muhammad. This led to a near global blackout of the YouTube site for around two hours, as the Pakistani block was inadvertently transferred to other countries. On February 26, 2008, the ban was lifted after the website had removed the objectionable content from its servers at the request of the government. Many Pakistanis circumvented the three-day block by using virtual private network software. In May 2010, following the Everybody Draw Mohammed Day, Pakistan again blocked access to YouTube, citing "growing sacrilegious content". The ban was lifted on May 27, 2010, after the website removed the objectionable content from its servers at the request of the government. However, individual videos deemed offensive to Muslims posted on YouTube will continue to be blocked. Pakistan again placed a ban on YouTube in September 2012, after the site refused to remove the film Innocence of Muslims. The ban was lifted in January 2016 after YouTube launched a Pakistan-specific version.
 Libya blocked access on January 24, 2010, because of videos that featured demonstrations in the city of Benghazi by families of detainees who were killed in Abu Salim prison in 1996, and videos of family members of Libyan leader Muammar Gaddafi at parties. The blocking was criticized by Human Rights Watch. In November 2011, after the Libyan Civil War, YouTube was once again allowed in Libya.
 Afghanistan, Bangladesh, Pakistan, and Sudan blocked access in September 2012 following controversy over a 14-minute trailer for the film Innocence of Muslims which had been posted on the site. A court in the southern Russian Republic of Chechnya ruled that Innocence of Muslims should be banned. In Libya and Egypt, it was blamed for violent protests. YouTube stated: "This video—which is widely available on the Web—is clearly within our guidelines and so will stay on YouTube. However, given the very difficult situation in Libya and Egypt we have temporarily restricted access in both countries."
 Russia threatened to ban YouTube after deleting two German RT channels in September 2021. Following the 2022 Russian invasion of Ukraine, YouTube on March 1 announced it was beginning to remove content from RT (and other Russian government funded outlets) from its platform in Europe.

See also

 Alternative media
 BookTube
 BreadTube
 CNN/YouTube presidential debates
 Comparison of video hosting services
 List of Google Easter eggs#YouTube
 List of Internet phenomena
 List of most-viewed online videos in the first 24 hours
 List of most-disliked YouTube videos
 List of most-liked YouTube videos
 List of most-viewed YouTube videos
 List of most-subscribed YouTube channels
 List of online video platforms
 List of YouTubers
 Ouellette v. Viacom International Inc.
 Reply girl
 Viacom International Inc. v. YouTube, Inc.
 YouTube Awards
 YouTube Creator Awards
 YouTube Instant
 YouTube Live
 Multi-channel network
 YouTube Music Awards
 YouTube Rewind
 YouTube Theater
 YouTube Poop

References

Further reading

 *

External links

 

 
2005 establishments in California
2006 mergers and acquisitions
Advertising video on demand
Alphabet Inc.
American companies established in 2005
Android (operating system) software
Companies based in San Mateo County, California
Go (programming language) software
Google acquisitions
Google services
Internet properties established in 2005
IOS software
Multilingual websites
PlayStation 4 software
PlayStation 5 software
Recommender systems
Social media
Transactional video on demand
Video game streaming services
Video hosting